Contoderopsis luzonica is a species of beetle in the family Cerambycidae. It was described by Breuning in 1970.

References

Acanthocinini
Beetles described in 1970
Taxa named by Stephan von Breuning (entomologist)